Clay Center Community High School (CCCHS) is the public high school in Clay Center, Kansas at 1630 9th Street.  It is operated by Clay County USD 379 school district.  The school mascot is the tiger and the school colors are black and orange.

Notable alumni
 Michael L. Printz (1937 - 1996), for whom the Michael L. Printz Award is named, librarian, graduated from the school in 1955.
 Roxie Powell, writer and poet attended the school
 Harold Riechers, writer.
Tracy Lee Claeys, football coach

See also
 List of high schools in Kansas
 List of unified school districts in Kansas

References

External links
 School website

Clay County, Kansas
Public high schools in Kansas